This is a list of electoral results for the Electoral district of Ivanhoe in Western Australian state elections.

Members for Ivanhoe

Election results

Elections in the 1900s

References

Western Australian state electoral results by district